The woolly-headed spiny tree-rat (Mesomys leniceps) is a species of rodent in the family Echimyidae. It is endemic to Peru.

The etymology of the species name corresponds to the Latin word leniceps constructed from lēnis meaning calm, gentle, and the suffix -ceps meaning headed.

References

Mesomys
Mammals of Peru
Mammals described in 1926
Taxa named by Oldfield Thomas
Taxonomy articles created by Polbot